Newton is a city in and the county seat of Jasper County, Illinois, United States. The population was 2,849 at the 2010 census, down from 3,069 at the 2000 census. Newton is home to a large coal-fired power plant operated by Illinois Power Generating Co and is close to Newton Lake State Fish and Wildlife Area and Sam Parr State Fish and Wildlife Area.

Newton is also home to the Drive 'n Theatre, formerly known as the Fairview Drive-In, which opened in 1953. It is one of 10 drive-ins left standing in Illinois.

Newton has produced several notable natives. These include pro baseball pitcher Ross Wolf, Illinois state representative Norman L. Benefiel, folk singer Burl Ives, Illinois state senator Albert Isley, and Irene Hunt, who set the historical novel about the Civil War, Across Five Aprils, in and around Newton.

Geography
Newton is located at the geographic center of Jasper County on a bluff overlooking the Embarras River.

Illinois Route 33 passes through the center of Newton as Jourdan Street; it leads east  to Robinson and northwest  to Effingham. Illinois Route 130 enters Newton from the south on Van Buren Street and leaves to the east on Jourdan Street with Route 33; Route 130 leads north  to Greenup and south  to Olney.

Demographics

As of the census of 2000, there were 3,069 people, 1,329 households, and 810 families residing in the city. The racial makeup of the city was 98.99% White, 0.10% African American, 0.20% Asian, 0.23% from other races, and 0.49% from two or more races. Hispanic or Latino of any race were 0.59% of the population. Among the White residents, the ancestral origin is primarily German with lesser contributions from England, France and Ireland. 
There were 1,329 households, out of which 27.9% had children under the age of 18 living with them, 48.5% were married couples living together, 9.3% had a female householder with no husband present, and 39.0% were non-families. 35.4% of all households were made up of individuals, and 19.6% had someone living alone who was 65 years of age or older. The average household size was 2.25 and the average family size was 2.94.

In the city, the population was spread out, with 23.9% under the age of 18, 9.3% from 18 to 24, 25.4% from 25 to 44, 20.4% from 45 to 64, and 21.1% who were 65 years of age or older. The median age was 39 years. For every 100 females, there were 84.9 males. For every 100 females age 18 and over, there were 81.2 males.

The median income for a household in the city was $30,280, and the median income for a family was $42,788. Males had a median income of $31,808 versus $17,877 for females. The per capita income for the city was $16,363. About 8.4% of families and 11.7% of the population were below the poverty line, including 20.7% of those under age 18 and 10.1% of those age 65 or over.

History
Newton is the largest, oldest and only city (although there are several villages) in Jasper County. Because of its favorable location within the county, it was named county seat in 1835.

Jasper County was formed in 1831 and approved on December 19, 1834. The county was named after Revolutionary War hero Sergeant Jasper. He and his close friend, Sergeant Newton, were patriots that saved American prisoners of war from certain death at the hands of British soldiers. Thus, the county and town became their namesakes.

A post office was established in Newton in March 1883. The post office was not established in a building, but rather in a man's hat. A rider brought the mail from Vincennes, Indiana, made a stop in Newton once a week and then continued delivering mail on his route north of Newton.

By 1841 the town had increased to five families. Lawrence Hollenbock and Samuel Garwood built a saw- and gristmill, and Benjamin Harris opened the first grocery store in Newton. In 1855, Newton had Miller's Hotel and a small inn known as the American House that is now Yesterday's Pub and Dining.

By 1865, the population of Newton had grown to 300; a decade later the population had reached 400. In 1874 Joe Litzelman's Hack Express began traveling daily to and from Olney on what is now Route 130.

Today, Newton has a population near 3,000. The community is made up of local businesses, industry, a high school of around 500 students and several organizations and churches. Downtown Newton is thriving after the completion of new lighting and a streetscape project. There are many organizations that keeping Newton moving forward including The Jasper County Chamber of Commerce, JEDI, 100 Women Who Care, Eagle For Life, and many more.

Education
Newton resides in the Jasper County Community Unit School District 1, which is geographically the largest school district in Illinois. The schools in the town include Newton Community High School/Jasper County Junior High, Newton Elementary and Saint Thomas Elementary School.

References

External links
City of Newton official website
Southeastern Illinois Convention & Visitors Bureau

Cities in Illinois
Cities in Jasper County, Illinois
County seats in Illinois
Populated places established in 1835